The  Foreign Operations Administration was created in 1953 under the directorship of Harold Stassen. Its purpose "was intended to centralize all governmental operations, as distinguished from policy formulation, that had as their purpose the cooperative development of economic and military strength among the nations of the free world". It was abolished by Executive Order 10610 on May 9, 1955. Its functions were split and transferred  to the United States Department of State and the United States Department of Defense.

See also
International Cooperation Administration

References
Records of U.S. Foreign Assistance Agencies in the National Archives
 The National Archives, Codification of Presidential Proclamations and Executive Orders, Executive Order 10477, n1.
 . Gerhard Peters (database). Accessed 15 November 2007.

Foreign relations agencies of the United States
Government agencies established in 1953
Government agencies disestablished in 1955
1953 establishments in the United States
1955 disestablishments in the United States